Raymond Otim (born  21 October 1986) in Kampala) is a Ugandan cricketer who played in the 2005 ICC Trophy in Ireland and the 2006 U-19 Cricket World Cup in Sri Lanka. He has also played in List A cricket for Uganda.

Otim played for Uganda in the 2014 Cricket World Cup Qualifier tournament in New Zealand. However, Otim and team-mate Faruk Ochimi did not return to Uganda with their team when the tournament ended, and remained in New Zealand where they sought asylum. Both players planned to travel to Australia to play with other Ugandan cricketers in the country. However, before reaching Australia, both cricketers turned themselves in to the New Zealand authorities.

References

1986 births
Living people
Ugandan cricketers
Cricketers from Kampala